Hafragilsfoss is a waterfall in Iceland.

The waterfall flows downstream from Dettifoss within the depths of the Jökulságljúfur canyon. This waterfall is also on the glacial river Jökulsá á Fjöllum, making it a powerful waterfall. The falls are visible from both sides of the river.

The waterfall has a single drop of 27 meters (89 feet) and has an average width of 91 meters (300 feet).

References 

Waterfalls of Iceland